A glitch is a sudden increase (around 1 part in 106) in the rotational frequency of a pulsar, which usually decreases steadily due to braking provided by the emission of radiation and high-energy particles.  It is unknown whether they are related to the timing noise which all pulsars exhibit.  Following a glitch is a period of gradual recovery where the observed periodicity slows to a period close to that observed before the glitch.  These gradual recovery periods have been observed to last from days to years.  Currently, only multiple glitches of the Crab and Vela pulsars have been observed and studied extensively.

Cause 
While the exact cause of glitches is unknown, they are thought to be caused by an internal process within the pulsar.  This differs from the steady decrease in the star's rotational frequency which is caused by external processes.  Although the details of the glitch process are unknown, it is thought that the resulting increase in the pulsar's rotational frequency is caused by a brief coupling of the pulsar's faster-spinning superfluid core to the crust, which are usually decoupled.  This brief coupling transfers angular momentum from core to the surface, which causes a decrease in the measured period.  It is thought that the coupling could be caused by a breaking of the pulsar's magnetic dipole, which would apply a torque to the crust, causing a brief coupling between the two parts.

Implications

Assuming that the mechanism described above is correct, observed pulsar glitches set a limit on the moment of inertia of the pulsar being observed and, thus, the mass-radius relation possible in dense nuclear matter. From extrapolating from a linear fit to the angular momentum transfer implied by the glitches observed in the Vela and Crab Pulsars, a so-called causality limit can be placed on the mass-radius relation of approximately

.

See also 
 Anti-glitch

References 
 
 https://web.archive.org/web/20051018233130/http://www.saao.ac.za/~wgssa/as4/urama.html http://www.saao.ac.za/~wgssa/as4/urama.html
 

Rotation-powered pulsars